Col Maarten Schalekamp was an officer in the South African Army from the artillery.

Military career 

He joined the South African Defence Force  and graduated from the South African Military Academy in 1976 with a Bachelor's degree from Stellenbosch University. He saw action during the Border War in the Angolan theatre of operations with 61 Mechanised Battalion Group, 14 Field Regiment and 4 Artillery Regiment. He served as Locating Battery Commander at 4 Artillery Regiment, Chief Instructor at the School of Artillery,  OC School of Artillery, OC HQ Group 30 and finally the last  Director of Artillery from 1996-1998. He retired from SANDF in 1998.

Honours and awards

Medals

Proficiency badges

References 

South African military officers
Living people
1954 births
Afrikaner people
South African people of Dutch descent
Stellenbosch University alumni
South African military personnel of the Border War